Makan Winkle Chothe (born 19 January 2000) is an Indian footballer who plays as a winger for Indian Super League club Goa.

Career statistics

Club

Honours
Goa
Durand Cup: 2021

References

2000 births
Living people
Indian footballers
Association football midfielders
RoundGlass Punjab FC players
I-League players
Indian Super League players
FC Goa players
I-League 2nd Division players
Footballers from Manipur
People from Chandel district
Naga people